The term releaser may refer to:
Monoamine releasing agent
A type of stimulus that can elicit a fixed action pattern
Acoustic release